In manufacturing, a pegging report is a record showing the relationship between demand and supply. Pegging reports are generated by Material Requirements Planning Systems. This report is used to develop the manufacturing strategies, to order components based upon the requirement proposed by the S&OP Team.

The report shows the creation of demand for the components by the parents, the quantities needed, and the schedule to which they are needed.

Supply chain management